Toi Hutchinson (born May 20, 1973) is an American politician who served as a member of the Illinois Senate from 2009 to 2019, representing the 40th District. The 40th district includes all or parts of Bradley, Bourbonnais, Chicago Heights, Flossmoor, Homewood, Hopkins Park, Kankakee, Olympia Fields, Peotone and University Park. Prior to her service in the Illinois Senate, Hutchinson was City Clerk for the Village of Olympia Fields, Illinois.

Early life and education
At nine years old, Hutchinson moved to Country Club Hills, Illinois, where she was raised by her mother and maternal grandparents. She attended Infant Jesus of Prague elementary school in Flossmoor, and Rich Central High School in Olympia Fields. At the University of Illinois at Champaign-Urbana, she earned a Bachelor of Arts degree, majoring in English and minoring in psychology. Hutchinson returned to her old high school as an English teacher. She graduated from Northern Illinois University's College of Law in 2014.

Career 
Hutchinson has worked on behalf of the State Alliance of YMCAs and for the Chicago Southland Chamber of Commerce's Government Affairs Council. In 2004, she became an Executive Management Fellow in the Women and Leadership program created by Harvard University's Kennedy School of Government. That same year, Hutchinson ran unsuccessfully for Supervisor of Bloom Township. The day after that election, she accepted a position on the staff of Debbie Halvorson. Hutchinson eventually became Halvorson's Chief of Staff.

Hutchinson was appointed in January 2009 to complete the rest of Debbie Halvorson's term following Halvorson's 2008 election to the United States House of Representatives. During her tenure, Hutchinson served on the Agriculture and Conservation, Labor, Local Government, Veteran Affairs, and Transportation committee.

Hutchinson left the Illinois Senate in 2019, and Patrick Joyce was appointed by local party leaders in the 40th district to succeed her.

Hutchinson was appointed president and CEO of the Marijuana Policy Project in December 2021.

2013 congressional special election 
After Jesse Jackson Jr. resigned from the United States House of Representatives after being investigated for the misuse campaign funds, Hutchinson announced her intent to run in the 2013 special election succeed him. She was endorsed by Cook County Board President Toni Preckwinkle, and Illinois State Representatives Anthony DeLuca, Lisa Dugan, Al Riley, and Thaddeus Jones. She was also endorsed by the mayors of Flossmoor and Kankakee, Illinois. In the Democratic primary, Hutchinson came in fifth place out of 16 candidates. Robin Kelly was eventually elected.

Cannabis czar 
On September 26, 2019, it was announced that Governor J. B. Pritzker appointed Hutchinson Illinois Cannabis Regulation Oversight Officer, a role created by the Illinois Cannabis Regulation and Tax Act, to oversee the roll out of the statewide legalization of recreational cannabis. Hutchinson will oversee relevant activities of multiple agencies including the Department of Agriculture, the Department of Public Health, Department of Revenue, Department of Commerce and Economic Opportunity, and the Department of Financial and Professional Regulation. She will also have input over the policies of the Illinois State Police.

Personal life 
She is married to Paul Hutchinson, a Senior Systems Engineer. They reside in Olympia Fields with their three children.

References

External links
Biography, bills and committees at the 98th Illinois General Assembly
By session: 98th, 97th, 96th, 95th
Illinois State Senator Toi Hutchinson legislative website
Senator Toi W. Hutchinson at Illinois Senate Democrats
 
Collected news and commentary at the Chicago Tribune

Illinois state senators
Living people
African-American state legislators in Illinois
African-American women in politics
Women state legislators in Illinois
University of Illinois alumni
Northern Illinois University alumni
1973 births
21st-century American politicians
21st-century American women politicians
People from Olympia Fields, Illinois
21st-century African-American women
21st-century African-American politicians
20th-century African-American people
20th-century African-American women